The Newark, New Jersey water crisis began in 2016 when elevated lead levels were observed in multiple Newark Public Schools district schools throughout the city.

Multiple water studies were conducted by both federal agencies, such as the United States Environmental Protection Agency, and non-profit groups. The lead levels exceeded the limit of 15 parts per billion set by the Safe Drinking Water Act. As a result, the EPA ordered the City of Newark to provide bottled water and filters to affected customers. As of January 2020, more than 200,000 residents were affected by the elevated levels of lead.

Background 
Much of the drinking water in Newark, and Northern New Jersey in general, comes from reservoirs. Drinking water then is processed through water treatment plants to the final destinations throughout the region. The water pipes that connect the main pipes to homes and businesses were lined with lead along with other chemicals. The water destroyed the lead-lined pipes, causing the lead to leak into the water supply.

The management of the city's water safety plan is under the jurisdiction of the Newark Watershed Conservation and Development Corporation (NWCDC), under the direction of a board appointed by the mayor of Newark. The New Jersey State Comptroller released a report in 2014 detailing widespread corruption throughout the agency. In early 2016, multiple agency officials were arrested and charged with accepting bribes.

Lead exposure 
Lead poisoning often occurs with no obvious symptoms, it frequently goes unrecognized. Lead poisoning can cause learning disabilities, behavioral problems, and, at very high levels, seizures, coma, and even death. No safe blood lead level has been identified. Pregnant women and children are most at risk. Lead exposure has been on the rise in New Jersey, especially in children. The highest numbers come from Newark in 2017, where 281 children between six months old and 26 months old tested in the city showed high lead levels in their blood. 

Newark addresses the issue of elevated blood lead levels in children through several means and has been allotted and continues to seek grants from governmental and non-governmental sources. In the past decade, Newark established and locally administers the State's only Lead-Safe Houses. The Lead-Safe Houses are used to relocate residents who have a child with an Elevated blood lead level (10 µg/dL or greater) when the family has no other temporary lead-safe housing alternatives.

Timeline

2016 
State and federal environment officials said that lead levels in multiple Newark Public Schools buildings were higher than the federal limit in March 2016. The trade union representing Newark public school teachers and the New Jersey Sierra Club said that the school leadership knew of the lead problem in the drinking water.

2017 
New Jersey Department of Environmental Protection mandated cities and towns to test the water supply twice a year. A report published by the City of Newark stated the city was in violation of the EPA's limit of lead levels in the drinking water.

2018 
In February 2018, engineering company CDM Smith said in an email to the City of Newark stated their prevention of lead pipes dissolving into the water system "has not been effective". Subsequently, Newark distributed Pur water filters to affective residents. During the height of the water crisis, Newark residents were able to receive 2 cases of 24 water bottles with proof of their address.

2019 
In August 2019, the city government received $120 million in funds to replace lead drinking water pipes throughout the city.

2020 
According to new tests conducted by the state of New Jersey, lead levels have dropped.

2021 
By August 2021, almost all of the lead water pipes in Newark had been replaced with copper ones, solving much of the water crisis problem. Mayor Ras Baraka continues to encourage Newark residents to trust the city and get their water tested, since it is free, to keep the water crisis from occurring again.

Response and aftermath 
Several news outlets, including  The New York Times, compared the water crisis to the one in Flint, Michigan. The Natural Resources Defense Council sued the Newark city government in 2018, saying the city has violated federal and state regulations regarding lead levels in drinking water. Mayor of Newark wrote a letter to the President of the United States Donald Trump, asking for federal assistance and funds to help repair and rebuild the water infrastructure. 

Introduced in September 2019, the Water Infrastructure Funding Transfer Act was passed by the United States Senate. It was sponsored by New Jersey Senator Cory Booker. The law allows the transfer the funds from the federal water fund to states. It was signed into law on September 27, 2019.

City response 
In March 2019, Newark announced the Lead Service Line Replacement Program, which aimed to remove all 18,000 lead pipes throughout the water system. More than 38,000 water filters were distributed to city residents, in addition to bottled water. A November 2019 report released by the Newark city government said that "97.5% of the filters reduced lead to 10 parts-per-billion (ppb) or below."

References 

2016 in New Jersey
2017 in New Jersey
2018 in New Jersey
2019 in New Jersey
Environment of New Jersey
Health in New Jersey
Lead poisoning incidents
2019 health disasters
2019 disasters in the United States
Newark, New Jersey